The Pottsville Citizen's Bank is a historic commercial building at 156 East Ash Street in downtown Pottsville, Arkansas.  It is a single-story brick building, with vernacular early 20th-century commercial styling, a flat roof (obscured by a parapet) and a concrete foundation.  It is joined by a party wall to a similar building on the right.  Built in 1913, it housed the first bank to establish business in the community.

The building was listed on the National Register of Historic Places, and is one of four buildings in the Pottsville Commercial Historic District.

See also
National Register of Historic Places listings in Pope County, Arkansas

References

Bank buildings on the National Register of Historic Places in Arkansas
National Register of Historic Places in Pope County, Arkansas
Commercial buildings completed in 1913
Individually listed contributing properties to historic districts on the National Register in Arkansas
1913 establishments in Arkansas
Buildings designated early commercial in the National Register of Historic Places in Arkansas